Alexander Marent (born February 21, 1969) is an Austrian cross-country skier. He represented Austria at the 1992 Winter Olympics in Albertville. At the 2002 Winter Olympics in Salt Lake City he placed fourth in the relay with the Austrian team.

Cross-country skiing results
All results are sourced from the International Ski Federation (FIS).

Olympic Games

World Championships

World Cup

Season standings

Team podiums

 1 victory 
 4 podiums

References

1969 births
Living people
Austrian male cross-country skiers
Cross-country skiers at the 1992 Winter Olympics
Cross-country skiers at the 2002 Winter Olympics
Olympic cross-country skiers of Austria
People from Bregenz District
Sportspeople from Vorarlberg
20th-century Austrian people